Nizhneismakovo (Tübänge Ismaq) is a rural locality (a village) in Ufimsky Selsoviet, Khaybullinsky District, Bashkortostan, Russia. The population was 93 as of 2010. There are 3 streets.

Geography 
Nizhneismakovo is located 45 km north of Akyar (the district's administrative centre) by road. Ufimsky is the nearest rural locality.

References 

Rural localities in Khaybullinsky District